The 1958 U.S. National Championships (now known as the US Open) was a tennis tournament that took place on the outdoor grass courts at the West Side Tennis Club, Forest Hills in New York City, United States. The tournament ran from 29 August until 7 September. It was the 78th staging of the U.S. National Championships, and the fourth Grand Slam tennis event of the year.

Finals

Men's singles

 Ashley Cooper defeated  Malcolm Anderson  6–2, 3–6, 4–6, 10–8, 8–6

Women's singles

 Althea Gibson defeated  Darlene Hard 3–6, 6–1, 6–2

Men's doubles
 Alex Olmedo (USA) /  Ham Richardson (USA) defeated  Sam Giammalva (USA) /  Barry MacKay (USA) 3–6, 6–3, 6–4, 6–4

Women's doubles
 Jeanne Arth (USA) /  Darlene Hard (USA) defeated  Althea Gibson (USA) /  Maria Bueno (BRA) 2–6, 6–3, 6–4

Mixed doubles
 Margaret Osborne (USA) /   Neale Fraser (AUS) defeated  Maria Bueno (BRA) /  Alex Olmedo (USA) 6–4, 3–6, 9–7

References

External links
Official US Open website

 
U.S. National Championships
U.S. National Championships (tennis) by year
U.S. National Championships
U.S. National Championships